Abdul Bari Pitafi is a Pakistani politician who has been a member of the Provincial Assembly of Sindh since August 2018.

Political career

He was elected to the Provincial Assembly of Sindh as a candidate of Pakistan Peoples Party from PS-19 Ghotki-II in the 2018 Sindh provincial election.

On 15 October 2018, he was inducted into the provincial Sindh cabinet of Chief Minister Syed Murad Ali Shah and was appointed as Provincial Minister of Sindh for Livestock and Fisheries with the additional ministerial portfolio of Cooperation.

References

Living people
Pakistan People's Party MPAs (Sindh)
Year of birth missing (living people)